The 3rd Sarasaviya Awards festival (Sinhala: 3වැනි සරසවිය සම්මාන උලෙළ), presented by the Associated Newspapers of Ceylon Limited, was held to honor the best films of 1965 Sinhala cinema on August 20, 1966, at the Colombo Race Course, Sri Lanka. For the first time in Sri Lankan award history, Bollywood celebrities Hindi actresses Nutan and Shashikala, then editors of Filmfare magazine B. J. K. Karanjia and Hindi actor Sunil Dutt were invited to participate as the chief guests at the awards night.

The film Saaravita won the most awards with nine including Best Film.

Awards

References

Sarasaviya Awards
Sarasaviya